was a Japanese politician during the postwar period who served as Deputy Prime Minister and a member of the National Diet. As Deputy Prime Minister, he was in charge of the 1964 Tokyo Olympics. In the 1950s and 1960s, he was the head of the powerful "Kōno Faction" within the ruling Liberal Democratic Party. Kōno aspired to become prime minister, but although he held a large number of important party and cabinet positions, reflecting his power and influence, he was not able to rise to the premiership before his death in 1965.

Elected to represent a portion of Kanagawa Prefecture, Kōno also exercised a powerful influence over his home prefecture, to such an extent that Kanagawa came to be nicknamed "Kōno Kingdom" (河野王国, Kōno ōkoku).

Early life

Kōno was born in 1898 to a wealthy farming family (gōnō) in Toyokawa village, Ashigarashimo District, Kanagawa Prefecture (present-day Naruda, Odawara City). His father, Jihei Kōno, served successively as mayor of Toyokawa, a member of the district council, and chairman of the Kanagawa Prefectural Assembly. Ichirō would later inherit many of his father's connections as he built up his own powerful political faction.

Groomed for a life in politics from a young age, Kōno graduated with a degree in political science from Waseda University, where he also competed in track and field. After graduation, Kōno worked for the Asahi Shimbun newspaper before entering electoral politics.

Kōno was first elected to the National Diet in 1932, and represented the Rikken Seiyūkai party. In the 1942 election, following the forced dissolution of all political parties except for a single national party called the Imperial Rule Assistance Association (IRAA), Kōno ran for reelection as a "non-recommended candidate," meaning he was not recommended by the IRAA. However, Kōno's base of power in Kanagawa was too strong and he easily won reelection. After winning the election, Kōno immediately joined the IRAA.

Postwar power broker

After Japan's defeat in World War II, Kōno was purged as a wartime leader by the US military occupation of Japan. Depurged in 1951 as part of the Reverse Course, Kōno helped Ichirō Hatoyama found the Liberal Party, which later merged with the Democratic Party in 1955 to become the Liberal Democratic Party.

In 1956, Kōno founded a "study group" called the "Spring and Autumn Society" (春秋会, Shunjūkai), which became the basis of his powerful personal faction in the Diet. Thereafter, Kōno routinely contended for the premiership in LDP party elections, and held a number of party and cabinet posts, including Director of the Economic Planning Agency (1957-1958), Minister of Agriculture and Forestry (1961-1962), Minister of Construction (1962-1964), and Minister of State in charge of planning the 1964 Tokyo Olympics (1964-1965).

During the 1960 Anpo Protests against renewal of the US-Japan Security Treaty, Kōno opposed prime minister Nobusuke Kishi's handling of the situation. During the May 19 Incident, when Kishi called for a surprise vote on the revised treaty without informing rival factions in his own party, Kōno deliberately absented himself and his faction from the vote in a show of protest. Thereafter, Kōno devoted himself to bringing down the Kishi cabinet as soon as possible. As punishment for his rebellion, Kōno was entirely excluded from the first cabinet of Kishi's successor Hayato Ikeda. In August 1960, Kōno threatened to bring down 1955 System by bolting the Liberal Democratic Party along with his faction and other allied factions, but was at length convinced to remain, and was eventually brought back into the cabinet as Minister of Agriculture and Forestry in 1961.

In the aftermath of the Anpo Protests, a wave of right-wing violence against major political figures was unleashed in Japan, and as part of this wave, police uncovered a plot to assassinate Kōno in 1963.

Over the years, Kōno had developed a reputation as an energetic and prudent cabinet minister across a number of different cabinets. Accordingly, in 1964 Prime Minister Ikeda tasked Kōno with the crucial task of overseeing the 1964 Tokyo Olympics. The Olympics were hailed by the Japanese media and around the world as a great success, winning Kōno praise for his effective management.

When Ikeda was forced to resign due to laryngeal cancer which ultimately proved fatal, Kōno was a leading candidate to succeed Ikeda as prime minister, along with Kishi's younger brother Eisaku Satō. However, out of respect for Ikeda's dying wish that Satō succeed him, Kōno declined to run for party president and instead supported Satō's ascension to the premiership. Kōno was rewarded with posts in the Satō cabinet as Deputy Prime Minister and Minister of Sports in charge of physical education.

Kōno died suddenly on July 8, 1965 of a ruptured aortic aneurysm. After Kōno's death, leadership of Kōno's powerful faction was inherited by faction member Yasuhiro Nakasone.

Legacy

Kōno was the founding member of a political dynasty in Japanese politics which later featured his younger brother Kenzō Kōno, his second son Yōhei Kōno, and his grandson (and Yohei's son) Tarō Kōno.

References 

|-

|-

|-

|-

|-

|-

|-

|-

1898 births
1965 deaths
Recipients of the Order of the Rising Sun with Paulownia Flowers
People from Kanagawa Prefecture
Waseda University alumni
Members of the House of Representatives (Empire of Japan)
Members of the House of Representatives (Japan)
Liberal Democratic Party (Japan) politicians
Politicians from Kanagawa Prefecture